Eoanthidium turnericum is a species of bee in the genus Eoanthidium. It is endemic to Southern Africa.

Ecology 
Eoanthidium turnericum visit the flowers of Cleome, Indigofera, Codon schenckii and Justicia dregei.

References

External links 
 

Species described in 1934
Insects described in 1934
Megachilidae